Paul Yu Pin (13 April 1901 – 16 August 1978) was a Chinese cardinal of the Catholic Church. He served as Archbishop of Nanking from 1946 until his death, having previously served as its Apostolic Vicar, and was elevated to the cardinalate in 1969.

Biography
Paul Yu Pin (Yu Bin) was born in Hailun, North East China, to Yu Shuiyuan and Xiao Aimei. Orphaned at age 7, he was baptized in 1914 after encountering missionary priests near Lansi, where he lived with his grandfather. Yu attended the provincial normal school in Heilongjiang, the Jesuit Aurora University in Shanghai, and the seminary in Kirin before going to Rome, where he studied at the Pontifical Urbaniana University (earning his doctorate in theology) and Pontifical Roman Athenaem S. Apollinare. He also studied at the Royal University in Perugia, from where he obtained a doctoral degree in politics.

Yu was ordained to the priesthood on 22 December 1928 by Archbishop Giuseppe Palica, and then taught at the Urbaniana University until 1933, when he returned to China. Upon his return, he was named National Director of Catholic Action, secretary of the Chinese nunciature, and Inspector General of Catholic schools in China.

On 17 July 1936, Yu was appointed Apostolic Vicar of Nanking and Titular Bishop of Sozusa in Palaestina by Pope Pius XI. He received his episcopal consecration on the following September 20 from Archbishop Mario Zanin, with Bishops Simon Tchu, SJ, and Paul Montaigne, CM, serving as co-consecrators, in Beijing. In 1937, the Imperial Japanese Army took Nanking and a reward of $100,000 was placed for the capture of Yu, who spent World War II in the United States. There he planned in 1943 to establish employment bureaus, available to American teachers, doctors, and technicians, in China. Also that year, the Chinese cleric supported two bills before the House Immigration Committee that allowed Chinese to enter and become citizens of the United States under the quota system. Yu, following his return to China, was promoted to the rank of a Metropolitan Archbishop when his vicariate was elevated as such by Pope Pius XII on 11 April 1946.

In 1949, the new Communist regime expelled him from his see, and he was yet again forced to leave the country, resuming his exile in the United States. During this time, the Archbishop dedicated himself to helping Chinese Americans and raising funds for refugees from Communist China in Taiwan, where he was made rector magnifico of Fu Jen Catholic University in 1961. He was one of Generalissimo Chiang Kai-Shek's closest advisors, and on the brink of McCarthyism, Archbishop Yü Pin made claims against Americans he thought were pro-Communist that turned out not to be true. 
Yü attended the Second Vatican Council from 1962 to 1965. During the Council he asked the Pope to address the issue of communism; however the Council did not address communism or socialism.Communism is a militant atheism and a crude materialism. In a word, it is a compilation of all heresies, and it must be treated as such, if the truth is to be defended. [The Council] must dispel the confusion created by the doctrine of peaceful co-existence, by the policy of the outstretched hand, and by Catholic communism, as it is called, all of which are stratagems calculated to assist communism and to create obscurity, doubt, or at least hesitation in the minds of Christians. In this matter the utmost clarity is now required.
He was created Cardinal Priest of Gesù Divin Lavoratore by Pope Paul VI in the consistory of 28 April 1969. Upon his resignation as Fu Jen's rector on 5 August 1978, he was named its Grand Chancellor. In 1976 he had become the first director of Dharma Realm Buddhist University's Institute for World Religions (now attached to Berkeley Buddhist Monastery).

He died from a heart attack at age 77 in Rome, where he had gone to participate in the conclave following Pope Paul VI's death in August 1978. Yu is interred in a mausoleum on the campus of Fu Jen Catholic University in Xinzhuang, Taipei County, in Taiwan.

Further reading

In European languages
Paul Yu-Pin, Un Problème psychique international: appel aux hommes de bonne foi aux hommes de bonne volonté. Bruxelles: Éd. de la Cité chrétienne, 1937.
The Voice of the Church in China, 1931–1932, 1937-1938, by Archbishop Marius Zanin, Bishop Auguste Haouisée and Bishop Paul Yu-Pin; with a preface by Dom Pierre-Célestin Lou Tseng-Tsiang. London and New York: Longmans, Green and co., 1938.
Eyes East: Selected Pronouncements of the Most Reverend Paul Yu-Pin. Paterson, N.J.: St. Anthony Guild Press, 1945.
Raymond De Jaegher, Vie de Mgr. Paul Yu Pin. Vietnam: Ed. du Pacifique libre, 1959.

References

External links

Catholic-Hierarchy
Cardinals of the Holy Roman Church

1901 births
1978 deaths
Chinese cardinals
Participants in the Second Vatican Council
20th-century Roman Catholic archbishops in China
Academic staff of Fu Jen Catholic University
Pontifical Urban University alumni
University of Perugia alumni
Cardinals created by Pope Paul VI
Presidents of universities and colleges in Taiwan
Taiwanese educators
Taiwanese people from Heilongjiang
Chinese Esperantists